Krzysztof Miętus (born 8 March 1991) is a Polish ski jumper, who has competed since 2008. He is a member of Polish youth team and participated in the Winter Olympics in Vancouver 2010.

Personal life
Krzysztof Miętus was born in Zakopane, Poland, but he lives in Dzianisz, Poland. His younger brother, Grzegorz, is also a ski jumper.

Career
One of his major achievements was the third place in winter Polish Championship in Zakopane in 2007, and the silver medal in summer Polish Championships in 2011. At the World Junior Championship took third place in team competition in Zakopane together with Maciej Kot, Łukasz Rutkowski and Dawid Kowal. In 2011, he won the qualification for the Lotos Poland Tour competition in Zakopane. He took part in World Junior Championships in Tarvisio (2007), Zakopane (2008), Hinterzarten (2010) and the Estonian Otepää (2011). At the 2010 Winter Olympics, he finished 36th both in the individual large and normal hill events. Miętus's best World Cup finish was fifth in the team large hill event at Finland in 2009.

Olympic Games
Krzysztof Miętus started at Olympic Games once – in Vancouver 2010. He was 36th on normal and large hills.

Individual

Krzysztof Miętus's starts at Olympic Games

References

External links

1991 births
Living people
Olympic ski jumpers of Poland
Sportspeople from Zakopane
Polish male ski jumpers
Ski jumpers at the 2010 Winter Olympics
Universiade medalists in ski jumping
Universiade bronze medalists for Poland
Competitors at the 2017 Winter Universiade
21st-century Polish people